Villarosa is a town and comune in the province of Enna, in the region of Sicily in southern Italy.

People
James E. Casale, architect
John LaRocca (1901–84), Sicilian-American mobster
Mike Fadale, actor, chef

Sister cities
 Morlanwelz, Belgium, since 2002
 Le Quesnoy, France, since 2006

References

External links
 Official website

Municipalities of the Province of Enna